The Learjet 55 "Longhorn" is an American business jet manufactured by Learjet.

Development and design
The Learjet 50 series was first announced at the 1977 Paris air show with larger cabins than the existing Learjets. The series was to have three variants, the Learjet 54, 55 and 56 but only the Learjet 55 was built. The Learjet 55 was a low-wing cantilever monoplane with NASA developed winglets, the winglets gave rise to the nickname Longhorn. The aircraft has a T-tail and is powered by two Garrett TFE731 turbofans mounted each side of the rear fuselage. It has a retractable tricycle landing gear and an enclosed cabin for up to ten passengers and a cockpit for the two crew. Construction of the Learjet 55 began in April 1978 after extensive testing and work on the wing design which came, initially, from the Learjet 25. The Learjet 55 first flew on 19 April 1979. The first production aircraft were produced starting 18 March 1981. 147 Learjet 55 aircraft were delivered.

By 2018, a Learjet 55 can be had for $1 million or less.

Variants
Learjet 54
Proposed 11-seat variant, not built.
Learjet 55
Production variant, 126 built.
Learjet 55B
1986 - Improved version with a glass cockpit, improved take-off performance and increased range, 8 built.
Learjet 55C
1987 - New rear underfuselage design, with Delta Fins to improve lateral Dutch roll stability, and reduce takeoff and landing speeds.
Learjet 55C/ER
Extended-range version of the Learjet 55C.
Learjet 55C/LR
Long-range version of the Learjet 55C, fitted with an extra tank, carrying an extra  of fuel in the tail cone.
Learjet 56
Proposed eight-seat version, not built.

Operators

 Servicios Aéreos Profesionales

Specifications

References

Notes

Bibliography

External links

55
1970s United States business aircraft
Twinjets
T-tail aircraft
Low-wing aircraft
Aircraft first flown in 1979